Stewart Castle may refer to:

 Stewart Castle, Jamaica
 Stewart Castle, Northern Ireland

See also
 Stewart's Castle, a mansion in Washington, DC, US